KO_OP is a Canadian artist-run game studio cooperative based in Montreal.

History 

Studio director Saleem Dabbous and programmer Bronson Zgeb founded KO_OP in 2012 to make "visually arresting avant-garde games". The studio is run as a workers cooperative with equal salary and decision-making between co-owners. Dabbous and Zgeb used personal savings to launch the company and relied on work-for-hire to finance its own games. They struggled with inexperience in their over-scoped early projects, as they moved through a dozen prototypes and eventually cancelled two projects in full production.

Gnog was nominated for Excellence in Visual Art at the 2016 Independent Games Festival and released in 2017. KO_OP also built "The Mirror of Spirits", an expansion for Lara Croft Go, in 2016.

KO_OP is currently developing a narrative-driven adventure game titled Goodbye Volcano High, which is scheduled for a June 2023 release on the PlayStation 5, PlayStation 4 and Steam.

References

External links 
 

Video game companies of Canada
Worker cooperatives of Canada
2012 establishments in Quebec
Canadian companies established in 2012
Video game companies established in 2012
Companies based in Montreal
Articles with underscores in the title